Topas is a German magician and comedian noted for his musical style of performance. His stage show with wife Roxanne has toured throughout the world, and has been featured on programs such as the French Le plus grand cabaret du monde and The World's Greatest Magic.

Awards
2004 - Milbourne Christopher Award - Illusionist of the Year.
2008 - World Magic Awards - Best Cabaret Male Magic. 
2011 - Academy of Magical Arts - Magician of the Year.

Television
The World's Greatest Magic
Le plus grand cabaret du monde

References

http://www.topasmagic.de/index.php?id=1,1,53

German magicians
Living people
Year of birth missing (living people)
Academy of Magical Arts Magician of the Year winners